Buff strength is a design term used in the certification of passenger railroad cars. It refers to the required resistance to deformation or permanent damage due to loads applied at the car's ends, either from push-or-pull loads on the buffer, Janney coupler or when rolling at slow speed into a fixed barrier such as a buffer stop.

United States
Buff strength requirements grew out of best-practice design standards during the latter part of the nineteenth century.

The Federal Static and Strength Regulation (49 Code of Federal Regulations § 238.203) requires that a passenger rail car be able to support a longitudinal static compressive load of  without permanent deformation.

Europe
Europe represents multiple certifying and approving agencies, so universal agreement on strength standards is not guaranteed. A 1977 German standard (VÖV 6.030.1/1977) presented values which have been followed by some other countries. The document was revised in 1992 and is presently known as VDV Recommendation 152 - Structural Requirements to Rail Vehicles for Public Mass Transit in Accordance with BOStrab.

In 1995 The European Common Market Committee for Standardization issued a draft document, Structural Requirements of Railway Vehicle Bodies.

See also 

 Compressive strength
 Container compression test
 Crashworthiness
 Deformation (engineering)
 Headstock (rolling stock)
 Railworthiness

References

Rail transport